Operation Avalanche was a four-week U.S.-led aggression in December 2003 designed to disrupt a resurgence in insurgent activity in the southeastern territory of Afghanistan and to establish conditions for the provision of humanitarian aid. Described by the U.S. government as the biggest ground operation in Afghanistan since the fall of the Taliban in late 2001, the offensive led to the capture of more than 100 suspects and the deaths of 10. Two soldiers from the US backed Afghan National Army were killed. The operation was marred by the accidental killings of 15 children in raids on suspected insurgents. 

The operation involved 2,000 U.S. soldiers supported by Western backed Afghan troops, but failed to engage any Taliban or allied insurgents.

Patrols were conducted and caves searched over a 40 square mile (100 km²) area. Little of note was discovered in the caves.

References

External links
 In Afghanistan, US forces launch "Operation Avalanche" 

Military operations of the War in Afghanistan (2001–2021) involving the United States
Military operations of the War in Afghanistan (2001–2021)